The Premio Biblioteca Breve is a literary award given annually by the publisher Seix Barral (now part of Grupo Planeta) to an unpublished novel in the Spanish language. Its prize is €30,000 and publication of the winning work. It is delivered in February, to a work from the preceding year.

History
On 14 June 1958, a jury comprising literary critics Josep Maria Castellet and José María Valverde, and editors  (editorial director), Juan Petit (literary director) and Carlos Barral (director of the collection), gave the inaugural award in Sitges, Barcelona. As stated by members of the jury, it was intended to encourage young writers and the renewal of Spanish literature.

The bases were also modified: for a few years the award took Petit's name as a tribute. In the same way, the Spanish political situation dictated that, in some editions, eligibility was extended to any Iberian Romance language, although no works in Catalan or Portuguese were awarded.

The 1971 edition's jury comprised Luis Goytisolo, Juan Rulfo, Joan Ferraté i Soler, and Pere Gimferrer, with Guillermo Cabrera Infante joining in 1972. However, in 1973 the award ceased to be given due to numerous internal factors (dissensions within the publisher) and external factors (problems with censorship).

In 1998, Basilio Baltasar, the new literary director of Seix Barral (by this time part of Grupo Planeta), decided to reconvene the prize, with the aim of recovering the spirit with which it was born, trying to recognize both Spanish and Latin American authors.

First era winners (1958–1972)
 1958 – Las afueras by Luis Goytisolo (Spain)
 1959 – Nuevas amistades by Juan García Hortelano (Spain)
 1960 – Declared vacant; finalists were Encerrados con un solo juguete by Juan Marsé (Spain), La criba by Daniel Sueiro (Spain), and Los extraordinarios by Ana Mairena (Mexico)
 1961 – Dos días de setiembre by José Manuel Caballero (Spain)
 1962 – The Time of the Hero by Mario Vargas Llosa (Peru)
 1963 –  by Vicente Leñero (Mexico)
 1964 – Vista de amanecer en el trópico by Guillermo Cabrera Infante (Cuba)
 1965 –  by Juan Marsé (Spain)
 Finalist: Betrayed by Rita Hayworth by Manuel Puig (Argentina)
 1966 – Not given
 1967 – A Change of Skin by Carlos Fuentes (Mexico)
 1968 – País portátil by Adriano González León (Venezuela)
 1969 – Una meditación by Juan Benet
 1970 – Due to internal problems at the publisher, no award was given in this edition. It would have gone to The Obscene Bird of Night by José Donoso (Chile).
 1971 – Sonámbulo del sol by Nivaria Tejera (Cuba)
 1972 – La circuncisión del señor solo by José Leyva (Spain)

Second era winners (1999–present)

Notes

References

External links
 Premio Biblioteca Breve at Grupo Planeta

1958 establishments in Spain
1973 disestablishments in Spain
1998 establishments in Spain
Awards disestablished in 1973
Awards established in 1958
Awards established in 1998
Spanish literary awards